Mare aux Vacoas is the largest reservoir in Mauritius. It is located in Plaines Wilhems, in the southwest of the island, to the south of the town of Curepipe. It was constructed in 1885.

Lakes of Mauritius